Cyperus rhynchosporoides is a species of sedge that is native to the African countries of Angola, the Democratic Republic of the Congo and Zambia.

The species was first formally described by the botanist Georg Kükenthal in 1936.

See also
 List of Cyperus species

References

rhynchosporoides
Taxa named by Georg Kükenthal
Plants described in 1936
Flora of Angola
Flora of Zambia
Flora of the Democratic Republic of the Congo